Hurricane Frederic was an intense and damaging tropical cyclone that carved a path of destruction from the Lesser Antilles to Quebec, in particular devastating areas of the United States Gulf Coast. Though only five were killed directly, the US$1.77 billion (equivalent to $ billion in ) in damage accrued by Frederic made it the Atlantic basin's costliest tropical cyclone on record at the time. Prior to its final landfall, the threat that Frederic imposed on areas of the U.S. Gulf Coast triggered a mass exodus from the region larger than any other evacuation in the past. While the storm primarily impacted the U.S. states of Mississippi and Alabama, lesser effects were felt throughout the Greater and Lesser Antilles, as well as inland North America.

Frederic was the thirteenth tropical cyclone, sixth named storm, third hurricane, and second major hurricane of the 1979 Atlantic hurricane season. It developed from a tropical depression south of the Cape Verde Islands on August 28. Tracking at a steady clip westward, the primitive cyclone reached tropical storm intensity the next day. Favorable conditions in the open Atlantic allowed for Frederic to reach hurricane intensity on September 1. However, outflow from nearby Hurricane David began to inhibit further intensification and would continue to do so for roughly a week, weakening Frederic as it tracked across the Greater Antilles. The tropical cyclone nearly dissipated over Cuba before redeveloping on September 9 near the Isle of Youth. Over the United States, Frederic weakened for a final time before becoming extratropical in Pennsylvania on September 14 and dissipating the next day.

Damage estimates vary due to inadequate reporting of private insurance claims as well as lack of hard data on uninsured damage; Frederic is believed to have inflicted $5 million (1979 USD) in both Puerto Rico and the U.S. Virgin Islands, with an additional $1.7 billion in damage on the mainland United States. FEMA, which had been established only three months before Frederic hit, was the focal point for nearly $250 million in federal aid for recovery, $188 million of which went to Alabama (1979 USD). In southern Alabama, the landscape was changed for years, with thousands of tall pine trees tilted and leaning northwest.

Meteorological history

The precursor to Hurricane Frederic emerged as a loosely defined tropical wave off the west coast of Africa late on August 27. The following day, satellite images indicated that the tropical wave had become more defined, and was beginning to show signs of cyclonic rotation. At 0600 UTC on August 29, the National Hurricane Center (NHC) classified the system as a tropical depression based on observational data from ships nearby in conjunction with satellite images. Upon developing into a tropical cyclone, the depression moved at an unusually rapid pace westward, gradually curving towards the west-northwest and slowly intensifying in ideal conditions. At 1200 UTC on August 30, the tropical depression was upgraded to tropical storm status and thus named Frederic. Intensification continued after the storm's upgrade, and early on September 1, Frederic developed an eye, prompting the NHC to further upgrade the tropical cyclone to hurricane status at 0600 UTC that day.

Frederic only maintained hurricane intensity for roughly eighteen hours over the open waters of the Atlantic on September 1 before outflow from nearby Hurricane David began to adversely affect the tropical cyclone. At 0000 UTC on September 2, Frederic weakened back to tropical storm strength while it was still well east of the Lesser Antilles. This weakening phase continued as Frederic began to assume a more westerly track and slow in forward motion. Frederic's interaction with Puerto Rico greatly disrupted the low-level circulation contained within the tropical cyclone, enhancing the weakening effects of Hurricane David's outflow. After passing over the island, the tropical storm briefly took a southwest course before curving into Hispaniola on September 6, inducing additional disruption within Frederic. At 1800 UTC that day, Frederic was downgraded to tropical depression status north of Haiti. Frederic remained a tropical depression for two days as it tracked into and then parallel to the southern coast of Cuba beginning on September 7. During this time, Hurricane David had tracked far into the Northeastern United States, and as a result its inhibiting effects of intensification ceased. At 0000 UTC on September 9, Frederic regained tropical storm intensity while located roughly /h) east of the Isle of Youth. The following day, the cyclone tracked over western Cuba as it gradually curved towards the northwest.

Favorable conditions, marked by very warm sea surface temperatures as high as 86 °F (30 °C) and the presence of a large anticyclone over the system, allowed Frederic to strengthen to hurricane status for a second time while just northwest of Cuba, despite proximity to land. Frederic took a northwesterly course throughout its trek across the Gulf of Mexico in early September, intensifying in a highly conducive environment. By 1800 UTC on September 10, the hurricane became stronger than it had ever been over the central Atlantic. Moving gradually faster in the Gulf of Mexico, Frederic eventually made two landfalls – one on Dauphin Island and the other near the border between Alabama and Mississippi – with a virtually unchanged intensity. Tracking rapidly northward, Frederic began to weaken due to land interaction, and was downgraded to tropical storm status while it was near Meridian, Mississippi on September 13. At around the same time, the cyclone began to curve northeastward, eventually merging with an extratropical cyclone in southwestern Pennsylvania by 1800 UTC on September 14. These extratropical remnants proceeded to track through the Mid-Atlantic states and New England before they were last officially documented by the NHC in New Brunswick on September 15. However, the Canadian Hurricane Centre still considered the cyclone active up until the storm entered the Labrador Sea on September 16.

Preparations

The first tropical cyclone watches and warnings issued in association with Frederic were on September 3, when the National Hurricane Center issued a hurricane warning and gale warning for several islands of the Lesser Antilles stretching from Dominica to the northern Leeward Islands. Residents of Charlotte Amalie in the United States Virgin Islands were urged by governor Juan Francisco Luis to move to 24 emergency shelters. Luis also mobilized a company of the Virgin Islands National Guard to expedite evacuations and protect emptied residences and other buildings from looting. Further south in Dominica, Melville Hall Airport was forced to close due to the presence of gale-force winds, delaying relief efforts following Hurricane David.

Despite having weakened to a tropical storm by the time Frederic moved over the Virgin Islands, the National Hurricane Center issued a hurricane watch for Puerto Rico on September 4. As precautionary measures, the Luis Muñoz Marín International Airport and schools closed for the duration of the storm. Hundreds of residents were ordered to evacuate from Toa Baja for the second time in just four days due to the threat of flooding rivers. In Trujillo Alto, a dike was relieved in order to mitigate potential flooding. After its track across Puerto Rico, gale warnings were issued for portions of the Dominican Republic and Haiti, as well as the Turks and Caicos Islands.  No watches or warnings were issued by the NHC for any areas while Frederic was classified as a tropical depression over the Greater Antilles. However, small craft warnings were posted for some coastal regions off of Miami, Florida due to strong winds caused by the nearby tropical cyclone.

After Frederic reattained hurricane status in the Gulf of Mexico on September 10, a gale warning were issued for the Dry Tortugas; this was the first NHC warning issued in association with the newly developed tropical cyclone. Not long after, a hurricane watch was issued for coastal areas extending from Panama City, Florida to Vermilion Bay in Louisiana. Although forecasts showed that Frederic posed no threat to Sarasota, Florida, the city readied barrels of water if distribution was necessitated to Sarasota County's 58 emergency shelters. Municipality managers were asked to place their respective emergency personnel on standby. In Key West, Florida, city workers had shortened workdays while the storm moved close by.
 
Up to 500,000 were evacuated from the U.S. Gulf Coast in anticipation of Frederic's arrival.

Impact

Lesser Antilles and Puerto Rico
Effects from Frederic were first felt on the outward facing Leeward Islands. In Antigua, the threat of widespread power outages forced the insular government to shut down power. These strong winds also unroofed some buildings. Strong winds and rain were felt in Guadeloupe, Barbuda, and a number of other islands, but no damaging effects from the passing tropical cyclone occurred in those locations.

In St. Maarten, these strong winds toppled a radio antenna. Flowing floodwaters washed away plentiful food crops in the island. Some homes were damaged and others destroyed on the adjacent Sint Maarten. Off of the island, seven Japanese people were killed after their fishing boat sank during the storm.

Power outages knocked out electricity to half of Tortola in the British Virgin Islands and downed telephone lines. Rainfall and downed trees blocked several roads. Offshore, the yacht Princess blew out into sea, prompting a coast guard rescue of the ship and its crew.

As a tropical storm, Frederic dropped heavy rain across the U.S. Virgin Islands and Puerto Rico. Three apartments in the same apartment complex on St. Thomas were unroofed, displacing roughly 50 families. Electricity was deliberately cut during the late night hours to prevent the spread of power outages. The entirety of the U.S. Virgin Islands reported numerous felled trees and downed utility lines as a result of the strong winds. Wind damage on nearby Puerto Rico was of only minor extent and much less severe than in the Virgin Islands. However, torrential precipitation accounted for most of the damage, as the passage of Hurricane David less than a week earlier saturated soils, priming the area for floods induced by the passage of Frederic.

All rivers in southeastern Puerto Rico swelled and produce significant flooding in adjacent floodplains. The discharge of the Rio Santiago near Naguabo reached 100-year levels. These floods partially inundated several cities, submerged crops, and damaged numerous roads. Major arterial roads to and from Ponce were blocked by floodwater and landslide debris. Some portions of Puerto Rico Highway 3 were submerged by water from both the torrential rain and wave action. Damage from Frederic in Puerto Rico reached at least US$5 million, though western Puerto Rico sustained minimal damage from the storm. In St. Thomas, four small homes were destroyed by flooding, and an additional 50 sustained at least partial damage. One waterspout was reported off the coast, but did no damage. Normally dry coastal guts in St. Croix filled with floodwater from Frederic, damaging homes and other buildings in five communities on St. Croix. Culverts, bridges, and heavy beach erosion resulted from rough surf off the coast of the island. The floods generated various sewage problems.  Damage in Virgin Islands also reached at least US$5 million, similar to Puerto Rico.

Hispaniola and Cuba
Heavy rains buffeted the islands of Hispaniola and Cuba for several days as Frederic, albeit disorganized, tracked over the Greater Antilles. As with Puerto Rico and the Lesser Antilles, precipitation damage was exacerbated by the recent passage of Hurricane David. In Guantánamo on Cuba's eastern Atlantic coast, at least  of rainfall was reported. However, damage from Frederic in Hispaniola and eastern Cuba remained minimal.

Frederic's landfall on western Cuba as a redeveloped tropical cyclone was much more significant than its first Cuban landfall. Despite recent renovations at José Martí International Airport, the lack of a proper drainage system allowed rainfall to inundate the airport, stranding several heads of state that were scheduled to hold a summit and disrupting air traffic to and from the airport for an entire week. Heavy precipitation triggered numerous landslides, causing severe damage to infrastructure and over 250 dwellings. Areas at risk for additional landslide activity were declared inhospitable, resulting in the evacuation of 1,200 people. A lack of damage reports was evident from western Cuba following Frederic's landfall, though damage estimates were high.

United States

Five deaths were directly attributed to Frederic in the United States, four of which occurred inland: a person swept from a boat near Pensacola was the only casualty along the coast. In total, Frederic was responsible for $1.7 billion in damages. This made Frederic the costliest hurricane in the history of the United States at the time; the figure was not surpassed until Hurricane Alicia in 1983. Frederic also dumped heavy rainfall across much of the eastern United States. Over a dozen tornadoes were also reported in Frederic's wake. However, these had minimal impact.

Florida
As Frederic was strengthening in the Gulf of Mexico, strong winds were reported in the Florida Keys. A station on the Dry Tortugas recorded a  wind gust on September 10; this was stronger than any other Florida wind gust measurement in association with Frederic. Rainfall from the extremities of the hurricane reached South Florida, with some rainfall totals exceeding .

Alabama
Frederic made landfall at Dauphin Island, Alabama and continued across to a point on the Alabama/Mississippi state line near Bayou La Batre, Alabama.
Near-total property damage occurred along the Alabama coastline between Fort Morgan and Gulf Shores, the latter seeing 80% of its buildings completely destroyed. The causeway linking Dauphin Island to the mainland was swept away in many areas.  Alabama's second-largest city (at that time),  Mobile, Alabama suffered extensive damage as well. Wind damage was also severe, especially across southern Alabama. Hurricane-force gusts were felt as far inland as Choctaw County. Structural failure was widespread in the immediate landfall area with industrial, residential and governmental buildings as well as hospitals suffering heavy damage. Nearly 90% of the Mobile area lost electricity, and the historic City Hall experienced heavy roof damage. Many small beach houses were completely destroyed by high winds before the storm surge could add any effects. Tree damage with broken limbs was extensive, leaving thousands of tall pine trees all tilted, leaning in the direction of the wind. 11 Alabama counties were declared disaster areas.

Mississippi
About  of rain fell in Jackson County, Mississippi around Biloxi and Pascagoula. 16 Mississippi counties were declared disaster areas; the most in the United States. Hurricane-force winds were felt as far northward as Meridian, Mississippi.

Canada
Frederic dropped heavy rain across Canada as an extratropical storm, peaking at  near Ottawa, Ontario. Record precipitation was recorded at the J. S. Marshall Radar Observatory in Sainte-Anne-de-Bellevue, Quebec, which documented  of rain on September 15. Rainfall spread as far northeast as the eastern coast of Labrador. Flooding occurred in eastern Ontario and portions of the Niagara Peninsula, as noted in Cornwall. In Toronto, the rains led to a seven-car traffic collision and a separate car accident that injured two. Flooding also took place in southern Quebec, with floodwater submerging streets, basements, and underground parking lots in Montreal. Damage from southern Quebec reached C$8.238 million (US$7.095 million).

Aftermath

Eleven counties in Alabama, 16 in Mississippi, and five in Florida were declared eligible for disaster aid.

In retrospect, Frederic has been credited with spurring redevelopment in Mobile and the surrounding Gulf Coast region. For example, in testimony before Congress
in 1992, Robert Sheets (then the director of the National Hurricane Center), described the economic aftermath of Frederic:

Prior to Hurricane Frederic, there was one condominium complex on Gulf Shores, Alabama. Most of the homes were single, individual homes built behind the sand dunes. Today, where there used to be one condominium, there are now at least 104 complexes – not units, complexes – on Gulf Shores, Alabama.

Retirement

Because of extensive destruction, the name Frederic was retired, and will never again be used for an Atlantic hurricane. It was replaced with Fabian in the 1985 season until it would itself be retired after the 2003 season.

Hurricanes David and Frederic were the first male hurricane names to be retired, as the practice of alternating male and female hurricane names was introduced in the 1979 season.

In popular culture
"The New War," the first Mack Bolan novel after Don Pendleton turned over Executioner series to Gold Eagle, is set during Hurricane Frederic with the storm's devastation having a major effect on the story.

The Abyss, a novel by Orson Scott Card, made into a 1989 film, directed and written by James Cameron features Hurricane Frederick, although those events take place 10 years later.

The Elementals, the 1981 novel by Michael McDowell, references Hurricane Frederic in its conclusion.

See also

List of Category 4 Atlantic hurricanes
List of wettest tropical cyclones in Cuba
Hurricane Baker (1950) – struck the Virgin Islands before degenerating into a tropical depression over Hispaniola; redeveloped into a Category 2 hurricane in the Gulf of Mexico and struck Alabama
Hurricane Eloise (1975) – A Category 3 hurricane that produced torrential rainfall in the Greater Antilles prior to a destructive landfall on the Florida panhandle
Hurricane Elena (1985) – A Category 3 that took an erratic path in the Gulf of Mexico before its Mississippi landfall, resulting in severe and at times catastrophic effects across the U.S. Gulf Coast, particularly in Florida
Hurricane Georges (1998) – A Category 4 hurricane that caused widespread damage across much of the Greater and Lesser Antilles before its final landfall in the U.S. Gulf Coast, where it did additional damage

Notes

References

External links 

 Radar loop of Hurricane Frederic
 Satellite loop of David, Elena, Frederic, and Gloria
 NHC archive of Hurricane Frederic
 Hurricane Frederic from the United States Hurricanes website.
 20th Anniversary of Hurricane Frederic from FEMA website
 Hurricane Impacts on the Coastal Environment from the USGS website
 Frederic's path from Environment Canada website
 Observations over the NE Gulf of Mexico between June and October 1979 from a University of South Florida website
 Magazine Tells of Hurricane Frederic from the University of Alabama website New link
 

1979 Atlantic hurricane season
Category 4 Atlantic hurricanes
Frederic
Retired Atlantic hurricanes
Frederic
Frederic
Frederic
Frederic
Frederic
Frederic
Frederic
Frederic
Frederic
Frederic
Frederic
Frederic
Hurricanes in Alabama
Hurricanes in Mississippi
1979 natural disasters in the United States
1979 in the Caribbean
History of British Antigua and Barbuda
1979 in Saint Kitts and Nevis